Huayna quillosa is a moth in the family Cossidae, and the only species in the genus Huayna. It is found in Ecuador.

References

Natural History Museum Lepidoptera generic names catalog

Cossidae
Moths of South America